Jenei may refer to:

Emerich Jenei (born 1937), Romanian former football player and coach
Ileana Gyulai-Drîmbă-Jenei (born 1946), Romanian fencer
László Jenei (1923–2006), Hungarian water polo player
Rudolf Jenei (1901–1975), Hungarian football player and manager

See also
Jeny (disambiguation)
Jeney (disambiguation)
Jenny (disambiguation)